Church Point is a point  west of Camp Hill and  1.5 nautical miles (2.8 km) east of Chapel Hill on the south coast of Trinity Peninsula. The feature was sighted by the Swedish Antarctic Expedition in 1903; surveyed by the Falkland Islands Dependencies Survey (FIDS) in 1945 and so named because the point rises to a rock peak (355 m high), the sides of which resemble a church steeple.

References

Headlands of Trinity Peninsula